Richard C. Miller (born 1948) is a clinical psychologist, author, yoga scholar and advocate of yoga as therapy. He is the founding president of the Integrative Restoration Institute (IRI), co-founder of The International Association of Yoga Therapists (IAYT) and founding editor of the professional Journal of IAYT. He is also a founding member and past president of the Institute for Spirituality and Psychology,  Senior Advisor to the Baumann Institute, and was the founding president of the 501(c)(3) nonprofit Marin School of Yoga.

He is known for his work on the use of Yoga nidra for rehabilitating soldiers in pain using the iRest methodology.

Professional background 

For over 40 years, Miller's primary interests have included integrating nondual wisdom teachings of Yoga, Tantra, Advaita, Taoism, and Buddhism with Western psychology. In addition to his research and writing projects, Miller lectures and leads trainings and retreats internationally. Among his mentors, he credits T.K.V. Desikachar and Jean Klein.

Miller worked with Walter Reed Army Medical Center and the United States Department of Defense studying the efficacy of iRest Yoga Nidra. The iRest protocol was used with soldiers returning from Iraq and Afghanistan suffering from post-traumatic stress disorder (PTSD). Based on this work, the Surgeon General of the United States Army endorsed Yoga Nidra as a complementary alternative medicine (CAM) for chronic pain in 2010. Continuing studies are being conducted with the use of the iRest Yoga Nidra protocol as a treatment for PTSD and related symptoms.

Miller and his organization have iRest programs in the military (active duty and veterans), homeless shelters, prisons, hospices, senior facilities, universities, chemical dependency clinics, multiple sclerosis and cancer outpatient clinics, as well as yoga and meditation studios.

Published works

Books 
 Miller, Richard. The iRest Program for Healing PTSD: A Proven-Effective Approach to Using Yoga Nidra Meditation and Deep Relaxation Techniques to Overcome Trauma, New Harbinger, 2015.
 Yoga Nidra: A Meditative Practice for Deep Relaxation and Healing, Sounds True, 2005 and 2010. 
 Gomukasana, in American Yoga, Barnes & Noble, 2003. 
 The Search for Oneness, in Will Yoga and Meditation Really Change My Life? Storey Publishing, 2004. 
 Welcoming All That Is: Yoga Nidra and the Play of Opposites in Psychotherapy, in The Sacred Mirror: NondualWisdom & Psychotherapy, Paragon, 2003. Prendergast, Fenner & Krystal (ed.).  
 Opening To Empathy, UMI, Ann Arbor, Michigan, 1990
 The Theory and Practice of Yoga Nidra, Anahata Press, Mill Valley, 1985
 Langhana and Brhmana, The Institute of Yoga Teacher Education, San Francisco, 1980
 The Book of Internal Exercises, with Stephan Chang, Strawberry Hill Press, San Francisco, 1978

Journal articles 
 "The Power of Mudra", Yoga Journal, Sept/Oct 1996
 "Beginner’s Yoga Column", Yoga Journal, 1995
 "The Breath of Life", Yoga Journal, May/June 1994
 "Longing For Liberation", Journal of IAYT, Vol. 4, 1993
 "The Therapeutic Application of Yoga on Sciatica: A Case Study", Journal of IAYT, Vol. 3, 1992
 "Psychophysiology of Respiration: Western and Eastern Perspectives", Journal of IAYT, Vol. II, 1991
 "Working With The Breath", Yoga Journal, September 1989
 "Suffering According to the Yoga Sutras of Patanjali", Yoga Journal, July 1986
 "Breath and Movement", Yoga Journal, July 1984
 "Yoga and The Blind", Yoga Journal, January 1978

Audio presentations 
 iRest Meditation: Restorative Practices for Health, Resiliency, and Well-Being, Sounds True, 2015.
 Sounds of Silence: Chants to the Divine, 2010
 Resting In Stillness: The Practice of Integrative Restoration – iRest, 2009
 The Final Teachings: Awakening to Your True Nature: Healing and Awakening through the meditative practices of Integrative Restoration iRest Yoga Nidra, 2009
 Your Path, Buddha’s Path; Healing and Awakening through the meditative practices of Integrative Restoration iRest Yoga Nidra, 2009
 The Principles and Practice of Ujjayi Pranayama, Audiocassette Tape Set, Anahata Press, 1999
 The Principles and Practice of Yoga Nidra, Audiocassette Tape Set, Anahata Press, 1999
 Non-Dual Meditation, Audiocassette Tape, Anahata Press, 1998
 Pranayama, Breath of Life, Audiocassette Tape Set, Anahata Press, 1998
 The Yoga Sutra of Patanjali, Audiocassette Tape Set, Anahata Press, 1998

Misconduct 

On March 14, 2021, in response to an employee posting on Facebook, Miller published a statement taking responsibility for his conduct in 2012 towards an employee of Integrative Restoration Institute (IRI), which he agreed, in 2012, had led to her reporting "feeling uncomfortable" to the IRI board. In 2012 they both signed a "memorandum of understanding" which "acknowledged the inappropriateness" of Miller's actions and brought resolution to the incident.

References

External links 
 Integrative Restoration Institute
 Tami Simon interviews Yoga Nidra teacher Richard Miller on Sounds True Radio

American yoga teachers
Living people
1948 births
Yoga therapists